The Schwarzberghorn is a mountain of the Pennine Alps, located on the border between Switzerland and Italy. Its summit (3,609 m) is the tripoint between the valleys Mattertal, Saastal (both in Valais) and Valle Anzasca (in Piedmont) and the southernmost point of the Mischabel-Strahlhorn chain, and northern end of the Weissgrat.

References

External links
 Schwarzberghorn on Hikr

Mountains of the Alps
Alpine three-thousanders
Mountains of Valais
Italy–Switzerland border
International mountains of Europe
Mountains of Switzerland